Yan Cheshmeh (also Romanized as Yān Cheshmeh and Yān Chashmeh; also known as Halīleh and Yātcheshmeh) is a village in Sheyda Rural District of Sheyda District, Ben County, Chaharmahal and Bakhtiari province, Iran. At the 2006 census, its population was 2,244 in 564 households, when it was in the former Ben District of Shahrekord County, and before the district's elevation to county status. The following census in 2011 counted 2,230 people in 671 households. The latest census in 2016 showed a population of 2,190 people in 695 households, by which time it was in Sheyda District of the recently formed Ben County; it was the largest village in its rural district. The village is populated by Turkic people.

References 

Ben County

Populated places in Chaharmahal and Bakhtiari Province

Populated places in Ben County